Jurkowice may refer to the following places:
Jurkowice, Pomeranian Voivodeship (north Poland)
Jurkowice, Opatów County in Świętokrzyskie Voivodeship (south-central Poland)
Jurkowice, Staszów County in Świętokrzyskie Voivodeship (south-central Poland)